China Galaxy Securities Co., Ltd. is a Chinese brokerage and investment bank.

It raised US$1.1 billion on the Stock Exchange of Hong Kong in its debut in May 2013. In January 2015, the company announced plans to issue new shares worth US$2.3 billion on HKSE. On 21 April 2015, the company announced in a HKSE filing its plans to raise another US$3.1 billion by selling 2 billion new shares.

Since June 2017, it was part of Shanghai Stock Exchange's blue chip index: SSE 50 Index.

History
China Galaxy Securities was founded in Jan 26, 2007 with a capital of RMB 6 billion. Major contribution of fund was from Galaxy Financial Holdings which took up 99.89% of issued capital, with the remaining 0.11% being taken up by four promoters: Beijing Tsinghua Venture Capital (currently known as Qingyuan Defeng), Chongqing Water, China General and CNBM.

Management Board
The board of directors consist of 11 members, of which 2 are executive Directors, 5 non-executive Directors and 4 independent non-executive Directors. Directors are elected on 3-year term.

External links
China Galaxy Securities

See also 
 Securities industry in China

References

Companies listed on the Hong Kong Stock Exchange
Government-owned companies of China
Financial services companies of China
Investment banks in China
Companies in the CSI 100 Index
Companies based in Beijing